Kopargaon was a Lok Sabha parliamentary constituency of Maharashtra.

Members of Parliament

See also
 Kopargaon
 Shirdi Lok Sabha constituency
 List of Constituencies of the Lok Sabha

References

Former Lok Sabha constituencies of Maharashtra
Former constituencies of the Lok Sabha
2008 disestablishments in India
Constituencies disestablished in 2008